The Southern Star was a bi-weekly English language newspaper published on Wednesday and Saturdays in Bega, New South Wales, Australia. It was previously published as The Bega Gazette and County of Auckland Advertiser, and The Bega Gazette and Eden District or Southern Coast Advertiser.

Newspaper history 
The Bega Gazette and County of Auckland Advertiser, also known as The Bega Gazette, was a weekly newspaper first published in December 1864 by proprietor R. W. Sharpe. On 1 July 1865 the masthead changed to The Bega Gazette and Eden District or South Coast Advertiser. In 1900 Tarlington and Smith bought The Bega Gazette from William Henry Braine immediately changing the name to The Southern Star. The newspaper merged with the Bega Standard and Bega Budget to form Bega District News on 2 October 1923.

Digitisation 
The Bega Gazette and County of Auckland Advertiser, The Bega Gazette and Eden District or Southern Coast Advertiser, and The Southern Star have been digitised as part of the Australian Newspapers Digitisation Program of the National Library of Australia.

See also 
List of newspapers in Australia
List of newspapers in New South Wales

References

External links 
 
 
 

Defunct newspapers published in New South Wales
Newspapers on Trove